The Swiss National Mountain Bike Championships are held annually to decide the cycling champions in the mountain biking discipline, across various categories.

Men

Cross-country

Cross-country eliminator

Downhill

Marathon

Four cross

Women

Cross-country

Cross-country eliminator

Downhill

Marathon

Four cross

See also
Swiss National Road Race Championships
Swiss National Time Trial Championships
Swiss National Cyclo-cross Championships

References

Cycle races in Switzerland
Recurring sporting events established in 1994
1994 establishments in Switzerland
National mountain bike championships
Mountain biking events in Switzerland